Catherine Hester Ralfe (1831–1912) was a New Zealand dressmaker, teacher, storekeeper, housekeeper and diarist. She was born in Bantry Bay, County Cork, Ireland in about 1831.

References

People from County Cork
1831 births
1912 deaths
New Zealand traders
New Zealand educators
New Zealand diarists
Irish emigrants to New Zealand (before 1923)
Women diarists
19th-century New Zealand businesspeople
19th-century New Zealand businesswomen